Allting som vi har is a 2007 Torgny Melins studio album.

Track listing

Charts

References 

2007 albums
Torgny Melins albums
Swedish-language albums